Noel Jarvis (12 December 1924 – 14 February 1975) was an Australian rules footballer who played for Fitzroy in the Victorian Football League (VFL).

Jarvis played as a wingman and won premierships in both the Seniors and Reserves with Fitzroy in his debut season, 1944. He represented the VFL at the 1947 Hobart Carnival and in 1952.

Jarvis was appointed as captain-coach of Rochester in the Bendigo Football League in 1953.

References

External links

2004 obituary of Maurie Hearn, mentioning Clen Denning and Laurie Bickerton as the surviving members of the Maroons' 1944 side

1924 births
Australian rules footballers from Victoria (Australia)
Fitzroy Football Club players
Fitzroy Football Club Premiership players
1975 deaths
One-time VFL/AFL Premiership players